Mottu Palle is a village in Komarolu mandal Prakasam district of the Indian state of Andhra Pradesh.

Geography 

Mottu Palle is located at 15.2254°N 78.9556°E. It has an average elevation of 250 metres (820.21 feet)

Demographics 

According to the Indian census, 2011, the demographic details of Mottu Palle Village is as follows:
 Total Population: 415 in 118 Households.
 Male Population:211 and Female Population: 214
 Total Literates:47.54%

References 

 https://www.google.co.in/maps/place/Mottu+Palle,+Andhra+Pradesh+523373/@15.2277467,78.9534637,1100m/data=!3m1!1e3!4m5!3m4!1s0x3bb4ebdf46f14ded:0x3537788afd2b9839!8m2!3d15.2254702!4d78.9556932

 http://pincodeno.com/area/41147/mottu-palle-pincode

Villages in Prakasam district